Sundarapandian is a 2012 Indian Tamil-language comedy drama film directed by debutant S. R. Prabhakaran. Sasikumar played the title character, besides producing the film, while Vijay Sethupathi, Lakshmi Menon, Soori, Appukutty, Inigo Prabhakaran, and Soundararaja appeared in supporting roles. Music was composed by N. R. Raghunanthan, while cinematography was handled by Premkumar. The film released on 14 September 2012 to overall positive reviews. Following its commercial success, the film was remade in Telugu as Speedunnodu and in Kannada as Raja Huli.

Plot

Sundarapandian is the only son of Raghupathi, a rich landlord and the village head. He lives in Kandamanoor, near Theni. Murugesan and Arivazhagan are Sundarapandian's close friends from the same town. Arivu had failed his board exams twice and is now in his final year of college, while Sundarapandian completed college two years ago and is now living freely. Arivu falls in love with Archana, who lives in a small village near Usilampatti and sees daily on the bus from Madurai to Theni. Arivu is scared to propose his love and decides to get the help of Sundarapandian in expressing love.

Sundarapandian, Murugesan, and Arivu board the route bus daily in which Archana travels to her college. Bhuvaneshwaran also loves Archana and travels in the same bus, also trying to propose to her. There arises a clash between Arivu and Bhuvanesh. They resolve it, as Bhuvanesh's native close friend is Sundarapandian's classmate Paranjothi. They give Bhuvanesh 31 days to woo Archana, without any of them intervening, failing which he should not disturb her anymore ever. Bhuvanesh fails and seemingly leaves the way for Arivu. There, it is revealed that three years ago, Sundarapandian had proposed to Archana and she had rejected him. Upon Arivu's urging, Sundarapandian goes to Archana to give his proposal. The next day, Archana suddenly proposes to Sundarapandian, which shocks everyone. Archana likes Sundarapandian and was waiting to meet him to convey her love towards him. Arivu accepts to leave his love, and Sundarapandian accepts Archana, but her parents wanted her to marry their close relative Jegan, although she is not interested.

Archana had asked Sundarapandian not to contact her as she has exams coming. Bhuvanesh uses this time and verbally harasses Archana in the bus. Sundarapandian catches him and warns him not to repeat it. Sundarapandian asks Bhuvanesh to stop following Archana. The next day, Bhuvanesh comes with two of his friends and insults Archana again. Sundarapandian and his friends board the bus halfway, and a clash erupts between Sundarapandian and Bhuvanesh. Suddenly, Bhuvanesh is pushed out of the moving bus, which leads to his death. Sundarapandian is arrested for the murder but gets bailed from the case as it was termed as an accident. Raghupathi agrees to take care of Bhuvanesh's ailing parents and give money for his sister's marriage, but some of Bhuvanesh's friends wait for the right time to take revenge on Sundarapandian. Paranjothi is also angry on Sundarapandian but does not express it.

Meanwhile, Archana's parents try to force her to marry Jegan. Raghupathi comes to Archana's home with a marriage proposal between Archana and Sundarapandian. Raghupathi requests Archana's father Pandi to set aside the ego and fulfill his daughter's wish by getting her married to Sundarapandian. Pandi is convinced by Raghupathi's speech and agrees for the wedding with Sundarapandian. Jegan gets furious knowing that Archana is about to marry someone else. He is even more shocked to know that Sundarapandian is none other than his close friend in college but has lost contact after college days. Jegan decides to kill Sundarapandian, and Paranjothi decides to help him.

Paranjothi meets Sundarapandian and informs about Jegan's love towards Archana. He also lies that Jegan is transforming into a drunkard, worrying about his love in the outskirts of the town. Sundarapandian decides to meet Jegan and try to bring back him to normal. In the meantime, Paranjothi and Jegan have planned to kill Sundarapandian while he comes to meet Jegan. Arivu accompanies Sundarapandian while on the way to meet Jegan.

In the outskirts forests of the town, Sundarapandian meets Jegan and requests him to behave normally. He apologizes, saying that he never knew about his love towards Archana before, but Jegan does not listen to Sundarapandian and tries attacking him along with Paranjothi. Sundarapandian pushes them away and tries to escape from the place. Unfortunately, to his shock, Arivu stabs Sundarapandian in his back because has vengeance regarding his love for Archana.

Sundarapandian feels bad that all his friends betrayed him. However, he retaliates and hits back Jegan, Arivu and Paranjothi. He tells to Jegan that as he thought that he want to marry someone by force is good, while Sundarapandian wanting to marry a girl who loves him is wrong. He tells Paranjothi that he knew that Paranjothi sent the thugs to kill him, as one of them was wearing a shirt which Paranjothi had earlier worn. He reveals to Paranjothi that he didn't kill Bhuvanesh but it was actually Arivu who killed him. He took the blame as he thought it was an accident and to save Arivu. He laments that he has lost his closest friends, he is vexed up and leaves.

Sundarapandian and Archana later get married. The movie ends by showing that Sundarapandian did not disclose the betrayal committed by his friends to anyone but instead ended his friendship with them.

Cast

 Sasikumar as Sundarapandian, a college graduate who falls in love with Archana
 Vijay Sethupathi as Jegan, Archana's distant relative and Sundarapandian's friend who betrays him
 Lakshmi Menon as Archana, Sundarapandian's love interest (voice dubbed by Meenalokshini)
 Soori as Murugesan, Sundarapandian's friend
 Appukutty as Bhuvaneshwaran, a man who loves Archana but gets pushed off a bus by Arivu
 Inigo Prabakaran as Arivazhagan, Sundarapandian's friend who betrays him
 Soundararaja as Paranjothi, Sundarapandian's classmate and Bhuvanesh's close friend
 Aadukalam Naren as Kandamanoor Raghupathi Thevar, Sundarapandian's father
 Thennavan as Pandi Thevar, Archana's father
 Tulasi as Archana's mother
 Sujatha Sivakumar as Archana's aunt
 Soumya Satish as Sundarapandian's mother
 Neethu Neelambaran as Ilamathi
 Aravindh
 Madurai Janaki as Sundarapandian's Cousin

Soundtrack 

The music was composed by N. R. Raghunanthan. The audio was released by Bala and received by Muthaiya and Socrates, two assistant directors of Sasikumar.

Critical reception 
N. Venkateswaran from The Times of India gave it 3.5 out of 5 and called it a "clean family entertainer". The reviewer wrote that "the racy script, easy flowing dialogues and the twists he introduces in the screenplay to take it off the beaten path are commendable" and added that "one more student has passed out with flying colours from the Sasikumar school of cinema". in.com wrote "Sundarapandiyan is a well made commercial flick with right dose of comedy, sentiment and thrill". IBNLive claimed that the film was a "honest attempt. Prabhakar does his best and make it an interesting watch thanks to Sasikumar". A critic from Sify wrote that debutant director SR Prabhakaran made "a confident debut with a film that is both respectable and engaging" BollywoodLife praised the film, citing: "No masala elements, and still entertaining". Anupama Subramanian from Deccan Chronicle described it as an "honest attempt from Prabhakaran which is engaging family fare", while noting that "Sasi[kumar]'s touches [were] seen till [the] climax". Behindwoods gave 3 out of 5, calling it a "family entertainer with ample dose of comedy". Similarly, Zee News termed the film a "satisfying wholesome entertainer".

Awards

Tamil Nadu State Film Award
 Best Actress – Lakshmi Menon
 Best Villain – Vijay Sethupathi
 Best Screenplay writer – S. R. Prabhakaran

60th Filmfare Awards South
Nominated – Best Director – S. R. Prabhakaran
Nominated – Best Film

2nd South Indian International Movie Awards
 Best Female Debutant – Lakshmi Menon
 Nominated – Best Film
 Nominated – Best Debutant Director – S. R. Prabhakaran
 Nominated – Best Cinematographer – Premkumar
 Nominated – Best Comedian – Soori

7th Vijay Awards
Nominated – Best Debutant Director
Nominated – Best Film
Nominated – Best Debutant Actress

Vikatan Awards
 Vikatan Award for Best Debut Actress – Lakshmi Menon

References

External links
 

2012 films
2010s Tamil-language films
2010s action comedy-drama films
Tamil films remade in other languages
Indian action comedy-drama films
2012 directorial debut films